A halide is chemical compound containing a halogen atom.

 Halide minerals, a group of minerals which contain halogens
 Halide (name), a feminine Turkish given name
 Halide (programming language), a computer programming language

See also 

 Organic halide